Jake Hildebrand (born June 19, 1993) is an American ice hockey goaltender who is currently playing for the Löwen Frankfurt of the Deutsche Eishockey Liga (DEL).

Playing career
In 2012, Hildebrand enrolled at Michigan State University to play NCAA Men's Division I college hockey with the Michigan State Spartans of the Big Ten Conference. In his junior year, Hildebrand's outstanding play was recognized when he was selected the 2014–15 Big Ten Best Goaltender and Big Ten Player of the Year. He was also named to the NCAA (West) First All-American Team. At the end of his 2015–16 season with the Spartans, he signed with the Allen Americans of the ECHL.

As a free agent embarking on his professional career, Hildebrand agreed to a one-year contract with the Rockford IceHogs of the American Hockey League on June 15, 2016. In the 2016–17 season, Hildebrand as a depth goaltender appeared in just 3 games with the IceHogs, appearing primarily with ECHL affiliate, the Indy Fuel.

Unable to mark an impression with the IceHogs, Hildebrand left as a free agent and signed a one-year deal to continue in the ECHL with the Tulsa Oilers on August 3, 2017. In the 2017–18 season, Hildebrand assumed starting goaltender duties, appearing in 44 games with the Oilers and posting a .901 save percentage.

In the off-season, Hildebrand was traded by the Oilers to the Kalamazoo Wings in exchange for Scott Henegar on July 24, 2018.

With the Wing going on hiatus for the pandemic affected 2020–21 season, Hildebrand was signed as a free agent by the Florida Everblades of the ECHL on January 12, 2021. In the delayed 2020-21 season, Hildebrand established career highs and was the standout goaltender in the league, posting 23 wins and a 2.40 goals-against average and a .923 save percentage to be named the ECHL Goaltender of the Year.

After six seasons within the ECHL, Hildebrand opted to pursue a career abroad, agreeing to a one-year contract with German club, Löwen Frankfurt of the DEL2, on July 23, 2021.

Awards and honors

References

External links 

1993 births
AHCA Division I men's ice hockey All-Americans
Allen Americans players
American men's ice hockey goaltenders
Cedar Rapids RoughRiders players
Florida Everblades players
Ice hockey players from Pennsylvania
Indy Fuel players
Kalamazoo Wings (ECHL) players
Living people
Löwen Frankfurt players
Michigan State Spartans men's ice hockey players
People from Butler, Pennsylvania
Rockford IceHogs (AHL) players
Sioux City Musketeers players
Sportspeople from the Pittsburgh metropolitan area
Tulsa Oilers (1992–present) players